Galaor was a hero of Spanish romance.

The brother of Amadis de Gaul, Galaor was the model of a courtly paladin and was always ready with his sword to avenge the wrongs of widows and orphans.

See also

 Galaor, a comic book hero from Hexagon Comics

References
 
 Stories about Galaor

Arthurian characters